Negastrius is a genus of beetles belonging to the family Elateridae.

The species of this genus are found in Europe and Northern America.

Species:
 Negastrius arenicola (Boheman, 1854)

References

Elateridae
Elateridae genera